Kashmir Law College or KLC is a private law school situated at Khawja pora, Nowshera, Srinagar in the Indian union territory of Jammu and Kashmir. It offers undergraduate 3 years law courses, 5 Year Integrated B.A. LL.B. courses is approved by Bar Council of India (BCI), New Delhi and affiliated to University of Kashmir.

History
Kashmir Law College was established in 2005 by Shadab Educational Trust presently Shabad Foundation for Education and Charity. This is the first private law college of Srinagar city, Jammu and Kashmir.

References

Educational institutions established in 2005
2005 establishments in Jammu and Kashmir
Education in Srinagar
Universities and colleges in Srinagar
University of Kashmir
Law schools in Jammu and Kashmir